Henry John LaRose (October 25, 1951 – January 14, 2021) was an American pitcher in Major League Baseball who played briefly for the Boston Red Sox during the  season. Listed at 6'1", and 185 lb., he batted and threw left-handed.

On September 20, 1978, LaRose made a relief appearance against Detroit at Tiger Stadium. He allowed five runs (22.0 ERA), giving three hit and five walks without strikeouts over 2.0 innings of work. He did not have a decision and never appeared in a major league game again.

LaRose also played for the 1989 Winter Haven Super Sox of the Senior Professional Baseball Association. 

He died from COVID-19 on January 14, 2021, during the COVID-19 pandemic in Rhode Island.

See also
Cup of coffee

References

External links

Game Box-Score

1951 births
2021 deaths
Boston Red Sox players
Major League Baseball pitchers
Baseball players from Rhode Island
Sportspeople from Pawtucket, Rhode Island
Pawtucket Red Sox players
Jamestown Falcons players
Winston-Salem Red Sox players
Winter Haven Red Sox players
Winter Haven Super Sox players
Bristol Red Sox players
Rhode Island Red Sox players
Deaths from the COVID-19 pandemic in Rhode Island